Robert William Parker (born 26 November 1935) is an English former professional footballer, who played for Huddersfield Town and Barnsley.

References

1935 births
Living people
English footballers
Sportspeople from Seaham
Footballers from County Durham
Association football defenders
English Football League players
Huddersfield Town A.F.C. players
Barnsley F.C. players